Appnapan – Badalte Rishton Ka Bandhan is an Indian Hindi-language television drama series that ran from 15 June 2022 to 11 November 2022 at Sony Entertainment Television and from 14 to 18 November (last seven episodes) at Sony LIV app. Produced by Ekta Kapoor under Balaji Telefilms, it starred Cezanne Khan and Rajshree Thakur.

Plot
After their separation, Pallavi and Nikhil have raised their children alone. While Harsh and Manna are raised by Nikhil, Barkha, Gangan and Badal are raised by Pallavi. But despite their best efforts, they haven't managed to overcome the lack of the other parent in the children's lives. Fifteen years later, the two families meet and are initially at loggerheads, but they clear their misunderstanding and reunite. Pallavi and Nikhil decide to remarry on Nikhil's mother and the children's persuasion. However, their happiness is short-lived due to the arrival of Pallavi's cousin Sonali. Sonali was the cause of Nikhil and Pallavi's separation. She manipulates Pallavi and marries Nikhil.

Cast

Main
 Cezanne Khan as Nikhil "Nick" Jaisingh – Kinnu's son; Nandita's brother; Pallavi's husband; Harsh, Manna, Barkha and Gagan's father; Badal's adoptive father.
 Rajshree Thakur as Pallavi Gulati Jaisingh – Teji's daughter; Nikhil's wife; Sonali's cousin; Harsh, Manna, Barkha and Gagan's mother; Badal's adoptive mother.

Recurring
 Leena Jumani as Sonali Gulati – Pallavi's cousin; Mahesh's ex-wife; Mayank's ex-girlfriend; Badal's mother.
 Anju Mahendru as Teji Gulati – Pallavi's mother; Sonali's aunt; Harsh, Manna, Barkha and Gagan's grandmother; Badal's adoptive grandmother
 Baby Farida as Kinnu Jaisingh – Nikhil and Nandita's mother; Harsh, Manna, Barkha and Gagan's grandmother; Badal's adoptive grandmother
 Rinku Dhawan as Nandita Jaisingh – Kinnu's daughter; Nikhil's sister
 Keshav Mehta as Harsh Jaisingh – Pallavi and Nikhil's elder son; Manna, Barkha and Gagan's brother; Badal's adoptive brother
 Hassaan as Child Harsh Jaisingh
 Mehak Ghai as Manna Jaisingh – Pallavi and Nikhil's elder daughter; Harsh, Barkha and Gagan's sister; Badal's adoptive sister; Ishaan's love interest
 Aarna Khandelwal as Child Manna Jaisingh
 Shraddha Tripathi as Barkha Jaisingh – Pallavi and Nikhil's younger daughter; Harsh, Manna and Gagan's sister; Badal's adoptive sister; Ishaan's ex-fiancée.
 Aira Keyul Patel as Child Barkha Gulati
 Gautam Ahuja as Gagan Jaisingh – Pallavi and Nikhil's younger son; Harsh, Manna and Barkha's brother; Badal's adoptive brother
 Anmol Kajani as Badal Jaisingh – Sonali and Mayank's son; Pallavi and Nikhil's adoptive son; Harsh, Manna, Barkha and Gagan's adoptive brother
 Jatin Shah as Ranveer – Pallavi's friend who had a crush on her
 Suvansh Dhar / Shubham Dipta as Ishaan Agarwal – Nimmi's nephew; Barkha's ex-fiancé; Manna's love interest
 Mrinalini Tyagi as Lalita – Pallavi's friend
 Jay Zaveri as Shanky – Nikhil's friend
 Mridula Oberoi as Nimmi Agarwal – Ishaan's aunt
 Madhubala Atri as Bitti - Gagan's friend
 Unknown as Mayank – Sonali's ex-boyfriend; Badal's father

Production

Casting
Rajshree Thakur and Cezzane Khan were cast as the leads. While Thakur portrayed Pallavi, Khan portrayed Nikhil.

Shraddha Tripathi and Mehak Ghai were cast as Thakur and Khan's daughter, marking their acting debut. Mridula Oberoi was cast as the antagonist.

In September 2022, Leena Jumani was cast as the negative lead.

Release
Appnapan – Badalte Rishton Ka Bandhans promos were released in February 2022. It premeried on 15 June 2022 on Sony Entertainment Television.

Crossover
Appnapan – Badalte Rishton Ka Bandhan and Bade Achhe Lagte Hain 2 came together for an integration week, called "Mahasangam Saptah". The episodes revolved around Bade Achhes characters, Vikrant and Sara’s wedding ceremonies, which took place in Meerut.

Awards and nominations

See also
List of programs broadcast by Sony Entertainment Television

References

External links 
 
 Appnapan - Badalate Rishton Ka Bandhan on SonyLIV
 Appnapan - Badalate Rishton Ka Bandhan on MX Player

Balaji Telefilms television series
Hindi-language television shows
Indian drama television series
Indian television soap operas
Sony Entertainment Television original programming
2022 Indian television series debuts